Jack Hammer is a South African rock band formed by Piet Botha in 1985.

External links
 Official Piet Botha website
 Official Jack Hammer website

South African musical groups
Musical groups established in 1985
1985 establishments in South Africa